Laelia is a small genus of 25 species in the orchid family (Orchidaceae). Laelia species are found in areas of subtropical or temperate climate in Central and South America, but mostly in Mexico. Laelia is abbreviated L. in the horticultural trade.

Description
Mostly epiphyte herbs (with a few lithophytes) with laterally compressed pseudobulbs. One to four leathery or fleshy leaves are born near the top of each pseudobulb, and can be broadly ovate to oblong. The inflorescence is a terminal raceme (rarely a panicle). The flowers have 8 pollinia; petals are of a thinner texture than the sepals; sepals and petals are of similar shape, but the sepals being narrower; the lip or labellum is free from the arched flower column.

Distribution
Species of Laelia can be found from western Mexico south to Bolivia, from sea level to mountain forests.

Taxonomy
The genus Laelia was described as part of subfamily Epidendroideae by John Lindley. Brazilian Laelias, after being classified for several years under Sophronitis, have now been placed in the genus Cattleya. Moreover, species formerly placed in the genus Schomburgkia have been moved either to the genus Laelia or Myrmecophila.

Species
Laelia comprises the following species:

Ecology
Species in this genus are found in forests from sea level to mountain habitats above 2000 m. Species from above 2000 m of elevation like L. albida, and L. autumnalis are adapted to temperate climates and can be grown outdoors in places like the Mexican Plateau, California and other subtropical areas with cool summers.

Laelia is one of the orchid genera known to use crassulacean acid metabolism photosynthesis, which reduces evapotranspiration during daylight because carbon dioxide is collected at night.

Cultivation
Laelias can be grown fastened to tree trunks, as long as the tree won't cast a deep shadow; they can also be fastened to a piece of branch or a slab of cork so they can be hung in a place facing south. The growing medium must have good drainage, rapidly drying after watering; pieces of pine bark, charcoal or pebbles are good choices. If grown mounted they definitely need approximately 50–70% humidity, while cooler temperatures increase the blooming process. Watering can be done 2–3 times a week, but with lower frequency in winter. Fertilization can be done with a very dilute solution, twice a month especially during growing season (May to November in Northern Hemisphere).

Nothogenera 
Hybrids of Laelia with other orchid genera are placed in the following nothogenera (this list is incomplete):
 × Laeliocattleya (Lc.) = Cattleya × Laelia
 × Laeliocatonia (Lctna.) = Broughtonia × Cattleya × Laelia
 × Laeliocatarthron (Lcr.) = Cattleya × Caularthron × Laelia
 × Sophrolaelia (Sl.) = Laelia × Sophronitis
Rhyncholaelia is a distinct genus rather than a nothogenus.

References

External links
 

 
Epiphytic orchids
Laeliinae genera